The First Hour is a Ginx TV  production which plays the first hour of a brand new game or a recent classic for the very first time. The main presenter has always been Adam Savage and has been joined by guests such as Lucy James and Neil Cole.

History
A French version of the show started to film in November 2015 with original non-dubbed presenters.

The show was canceled on 11 April 2016 because its producers, Ginx TV, wanted to take the channel in a different direction. However, on 9 February 2017 it was confirmed via Ginx TV's Facebook page that the show would be back for a new series, starting 16 February 2017, with Adam Savage and Anthony Richardson returning as hosts of the show. The First Hour is currently in its 11th season.

Episodes
The following is a list of episodes of The First Hour, Adam Savage appears in all episodes unless specifically stated otherwise. They are seasoned from the production company. Since episode 34, Anthony Richardson is an indefinite part of the show.

Classics

Season 1

As of Episode 33 (Middle-earth: Shadow of Mordor), Anthony Richardson is a permanent co-presenter.

After Dark: Season 1

Season 2

Season 3

Season 4
As of April 2016, the show was effectively cancelled after the Ginx rebrand under the Esports banner, focusing on multiplayer arena shows. However, repeats of the Classics and After Dark series through the Autumn maintained Viewer interest and in January 2017, the show was announced to be returning with Adam & Anthony as hosts. In addition to Triple A releases that the duo missed while the show was in hiatus, the main focus has been on Multiplayer Arena Combat, Team vs Team games etc. The show currently airs Thursday at 8 pm with repeats at the weekend.

See also
 Videogame Nation

References

2013 British television series debuts
Television shows about video games
Video gaming in the United Kingdom